The 1995 Sydney Bulldogs season was the 60th in the club's history. Coached by Chris Anderson and captained by Terry Lamb, they competed in the Australian Rugby League's 1995 ARL season, finishing the regular season 6th (out of 22), to qualify for the finals for a 3rd consecutive year. The team went on to win all three of their finals matches to reach the Grand Final against minor premiers, the Manly-Warringah Sea Eagles which the Bulldogs won 17-4, claiming their 7th Premiership.

Ladder

Auckland Warriors were stripped of 2 competition points due to exceeding the replacement limit in round 3.

See also
 List of Canterbury-Bankstown Bulldogs seasons

References

Canterbury-Bankstown Bulldogs seasons
Sydney Bulldogs season